Valdosta is a city in southern Georgia, United States. "Valdosta" may also refer to:

 Valdosta metropolitan area
 Valdosta Commercial Historic District
 Valdosta State University
 Valdosta State Blazers the athletic programs of the University.
 Valdosta State Blazers football, the football team of Valdosta State University.
 Valdosta State–West Georgia football rivalry
 Valdosta State University Rugby Club
 Valdosta High School
 Valdosta Regional Airport
 Valdosta City School District
 Valdosta Railway
 Valdosta Tigers 
 Valdosta Mall
 Valdosta (EP)
 Valdostan Union, a political party in Italy.